Sarah Gibson (born April 20, 1995) is an American swimmer who completed her college career at Texas A&M University in 2017. She competed in the women's 100 metre butterfly event at the 2017 World Aquatics Championships.

Gibson, who grew up in San Antonio, was named the NCAA Division I Academic All-American across all Division I sports for the 2016–17 school year by the College Sports Information Directors of America.

References

1995 births
Living people
American female swimmers
Sportspeople from Colorado Springs, Colorado
Sportspeople from San Antonio
Texas A&M Aggies women's swimmers
World Aquatics Championships medalists in swimming
Swimmers at the 2019 Pan American Games
Pan American Games medalists in swimming
Pan American Games gold medalists for the United States
Pan American Games bronze medalists for the United States
Medalists at the 2019 Pan American Games
21st-century American women